Genyoshi Kadokawa was the founder of Kadokawa Shoten. Several academic prizes have been named in his honor.

References

1917 births
1975 deaths
20th-century Japanese businesspeople
20th-century Japanese poets
Japanese company founders
Japanese literature academics
Japanese magazine founders
Japanese pacifists
Japanese schoolteachers
Kadokawa Shoten
Kokugakuin University alumni
People from Toyama (city)
Tuberculosis deaths in Japan
Yomiuri Prize winners
20th-century deaths from tuberculosis